The expansion of the National Basketball Association has happened several times in the league's history since it began play in 1946. The most recent examples of the expansion of the NBA are the Charlotte Hornets and Miami Heat in 1988, Minnesota Timberwolves and Orlando Magic in 1989, Toronto Raptors and Vancouver Grizzlies in 1995 (who relocated to Memphis in 2001), and New Orleans Hornets in 2002. In June 2022, Commissioner Adam Silver confirmed that while there are no current plans to expand beyond 30 teams, the NBA "invariably will expand."

Early years: 1946–1966
There was a lot of expansion and moving of organizations in the early years of the NBA. During this 20-year time period is when notable franchises entered the NBA like the Syracuse Nationals (now the Philadelphia 76ers), the Philadelphia Warriors (now the Golden State Warriors), Minneapolis Lakers (now the Los Angeles Lakers), and Rochester Royals (now the Sacramento Kings).

During this time period the league experienced its first substantial growth, although it was short-lived, as the league was back down to nine teams by 1961.

Expansion Era: 1966–1980
During a span of 15 years, 14 of the 30 current teams were brought into the league, beginning with the Chicago Bulls in 1966. The San Diego Rockets (now Houston Rockets) and Seattle SuperSonics (now Oklahoma City Thunder) joined one year later, with the Phoenix Suns and Milwaukee Bucks following them in 1968. After two more seasons, in 1970, the Buffalo Braves (later San Diego Clippers, now Los Angeles Clippers), Cleveland Cavaliers, and Portland Trail Blazers all began play. The New Orleans Jazz (now Utah Jazz) became the league's 18th franchise in 1974.

Following the 1975–76 season, the NBA merged with the American Basketball Association, a competing league that had operated for nine seasons beginning in 1967. With the ABA–NBA merger, four ABA teams became members of the NBA: the Denver Nuggets, Indiana Pacers, New York Nets (became New Jersey Nets, now Brooklyn Nets) and the San Antonio Spurs. In 1980, the Dallas Mavericks were created as the league's 23rd member.

Modern expansion: 1988 to 2004
The NBA has added seven more franchises from 1988 to present, the latest in 2004. Four teams were created in 1988 and 1989: the Charlotte Hornets, the Miami Heat and Orlando Magic, both in Florida, and the Minnesota Timberwolves. In 1995 the NBA created two new teams in Canada, its first since the inaugural 1946–47 season with one in Toronto; namely, the Toronto Raptors and Vancouver Grizzlies (now Memphis Grizzlies). The league expanded to 30 with the Charlotte Bobcats in 2004, following the 2002 relocation of the Charlotte Hornets to New Orleans. In 2014, the Bobcats rebranded to and acquired the history of the Charlotte Hornets, with the now New Orleans Pelicans being retroactively recognized as a new franchise founded in 2002.

Team timeline

See Timeline for the history of teams who participated in the NBA.

Expansion drafts
There have been 11 expansion drafts in NBA history. An additional four of the league's current teams joined via the 1976 ABA–NBA merger.

Potential expansion cities

Seattle
Seattle is the most populous metropolitan area and also the largest American media market without an NBA franchise. The city previously hosted the Seattle SuperSonics from the  season until the  season, after which the team was sold and relocated to Oklahoma City. The sale and relocation stemmed from team and local officials being unable to come to an agreement to build a new arena for the team in the Seattle area. Seattle is widely considered the leading candidate to host a potential NBA expansion team.

It was reported in 2013 that the Sacramento Kings were close to moving their franchise to Seattle, but the NBA Board of Owners voted against relocation, thus ensuring that the Kings would remain in Sacramento, California.

, the only statements that had been made by the NBA about it returning to Seattle had been that it would likely be through league expansion.

On December 3, 2018, the renovation of what was once the KeyArena (now Climate Pledge Arena) began, bringing the arena to current NBA standards and in preparation for the then upcoming National Hockey League (NHL) expansion franchise, the Seattle Kraken, who began play in 2021.

In late 2020, NBA commissioner Adam Silver said that Seattle is "at the top of the list" for when the NBA next "invariably" expands.

In addition to the NHL expansion Kraken, Seattle is currently home to the Seattle Seahawks of the National Football League (NFL), Seattle Mariners of Major League Baseball (MLB), Seattle Sounders FC of Major League Soccer (MLS), and Seattle Storm of the Women's National Basketball Association (WNBA).

Las Vegas
Las Vegas has long been rumored as a potential destination for a future NBA franchise. The city already hosts the NBA Summer League, which as of 2018, all league teams participate in.

The 2007 NBA All-Star Game took place in the city at the Thomas & Mack Center on the campus of the University of Nevada, Las Vegas. The arena is home to the UNLV Runnin' Rebels team of NCAA Division I's Mountain West Conference (MW).

In 2001, Las Vegas was included in the list of cities the Vancouver Grizzlies were considering relocating to, before the team ultimately chose to move to Memphis, Tennessee, to become the Memphis Grizzlies.

T-Mobile Arena, opened in 2016 and home of the National Hockey League (NHL)'s Vegas Golden Knights, has been suggested as a potential destination for a future franchise in the city. Las Vegas mayor Carolyn Goodman has been a vocal supporter of landing an NBA team for the city, including personally contacting NBA commissioner Adam Silver in early 2021.

In addition to the NHL's Golden Knights, who began play in 2017, Las Vegas is also home to the National Football League (NFL)'s Las Vegas Raiders, who relocated to the city in 2020, and the Women's National Basketball Association (WNBA)'s Las Vegas Aces, who relocated to the city in 2018.

In 2022, LeBron James expressed interest in owning an NBA team, specifically one located in Las Vegas.

San Diego
San Diego is the most populous city and second-most populous metropolitan area (after Seattle) in the United States without an NBA franchise. It is the largest American media market without a franchise in the NBA, National Football League (NFL), National Hockey League (NHL), Major League Soccer (MLS), or any combination of those leagues. San Diego is also the economic center of the San Diego–Tijuana binational metropolitan area, one of the world's most populous, home to an estimated 5.6 million residents as of 2020. The city is widely regarded as one of the most under-served pro sports markets in the United States, a view that gained additional traction following the 2017 departure of the NFL's Chargers to Los Angeles. The city currently hosts only Major League Baseball (MLB)'s San Diego Padres among major professional sports leagues. San Diego is home to three NCAA Division I men's basketball programs: the San Diego State Aztecs (SDSU) of the Mountain West Conference, the San Diego Toreros (USD) of the West Coast Conference and the UC San Diego Tritons (UCSD) of the Big West Conference.

For decades, San Diego has routinely hosted NBA teams for preseason training camps and exhibition games. In October 2021, three NBA teams simultaneously held their preseason camps in the city, one at each of the three local NCAA Division I universities (Los Angeles Clippers at SDSU, Brooklyn Nets at USD and Denver Nuggets at UCSD.

San Diego's history with professional basketball spans multiple teams, mostly encompassed within an 18-year period from 1967 to 1984. The city has been home to the NBA's San Diego Rockets (now Houston Rockets) from 1967 to 1971, the Golden State Warriors part-time for monthly games during the 1971–72 NBA season (initially planned for more), the American Basketball Association (ABA)'s San Diego Conquistadors/Sails (defunct) from 1972 to 1975, and the NBA's San Diego Clippers (now Los Angeles Clippers) from 1978 to 1984. The Warriors decided to remain full-time in the Bay Area, while the other three teams' times in the city were cut short due to complications surrounding the San Diego Sports Arena in combination with a variety of ownership issues.

The San Diego Rockets, who joined the NBA as an expansion team in 1967, played four seasons in San Diego before being purchased and relocated to Houston after founding owner Robert Breitbard encountered financial turmoil allegedly related to a tax-assessment issue surrounding the San Diego Sports Arena, which he had developed and owned the land lease for. The tax issue led to the arena's two tenants, the Rockets and original San Diego Gulls ice hockey team (also owned by Breitbard) of the Western Hockey League, to be served eviction notices in 1970, just three years after the arena opened. Breitbard turned down at least 14 out-of-town offers to buy the Rockets, hoping to find a buyer to keep the team in San Diego, but without another large arena in the San Diego area, the tax debt on the San Diego Sports Arena ultimately forced Breitbard to reluctantly sell the team to a Houston ownership group in a move the NBA hurriedly approved, fearing the franchise might otherwise fold.

The 1971 NBA All-Star Game was played in the city at the San Diego Sports Arena, where the Rockets hosted the game just months before being sold and relocated.

The San Diego Conquistadors (later Sails), were the first and only expansion team of the ABA, joining in 1972. The team was forced to play its first two seasons at a pair of small 3,200 seat venues, Peterson Gymnasium then Golden Hall, due to a feud between team owner Leonard Bloom and the new San Diego Sports Arena leaseholder Peter Graham, who had lost out to Bloom for the rights to the expansion franchise. The feud was finally resolved prior to the team's third season, allowing it to move to the Sports Arena. The franchise, newly rebranded as the Sails, was abruptly folded shortly after beginning its fourth season in 1975 after ownership learned the team was to be shut out of the upcoming ABA–NBA merger, reportedly at the insistence of then-Los Angeles Lakers owner Jack Kent Cooke. Cooke had feuded with the San Diego franchise's ownership over the Conquistadors’ 1973 signing of Wilt Chamberlain away from the Lakers to be a player-coach, which led to a legal dispute that resulted in Lakers ownership successfully suing Chamberlain and relegating him to only coaching duties with the Conquistadors. 

The San Diego Clippers, who in 1978 relocated to San Diego from Buffalo, New York (where they were known as the Buffalo Braves), played three seasons in San Diego before they were purchased by Los Angeles real estate developer Donald Sterling in 1981. The team played three additional seasons in San Diego that were mired in persistent attempts by Sterling to relocate the team to Los Angeles. Sterling was officially denied permission by the NBA to move the team to Los Angeles in both 1982 and 1984. In September 1982, following an NBA investigation, Sterling was found to have been late in paying creditors and players (among other violations), and a league committee recommended his ownership be terminated, with a league takeover of the Clippers to be implemented. Sterling narrowly avoided this however, by agreeing to hand over operational duties to Alan Rothenberg, who became the team's president. After the 1984 relocation rejection, Sterling moved the team to Los Angeles anyway, triggering a lawsuit filed by the NBA in federal court against Sterling, which aimed to return the Clippers to San Diego at threat of the league dissolving the franchise. Sterling ultimately prevailed over the league after a counter-suit and the team did not return to San Diego. Basketball Hall of Famer and San Diego native Bill Walton was a member of the Clippers for five of its six seasons in San Diego, though he appeared in just 102 games during the period due to recurring foot injuries, and has been outspokenly very self-critical about San Diego's loss of the Clippers. "I wish we had NBA basketball here, and we don't because of me. It's my greatest failure as a professional in my entire life. "It is a stain and stigma on my soul that is indelible. I'll never be able to wash that off, and I carry it with me forever." The Clippers relocation to Los Angeles remains the only franchise move in NBA history that was not approved by the NBA.

San Diego also hosted the Golden State Warriors for six games (initially planned for more) during the 1971–72 NBA season following the Rockets departure to Houston. The Warriors notably changed their name from "San Francisco" to "Golden State" prior to the season as the team was searching for a new home arena and looked to split the season between the San Francisco Bay Area and San Diego before committing to a new permanent home. The team ultimately stayed in the Bay Area, settling full-time in Oakland the following season.

In 1994, the Minnesota Timberwolves nearly relocated to San Diego to play in a proposed new downtown arena before the City of Minneapolis agreed to purchase the team's arena, Target Center, with $80 million in public bonds to help the team out of financial trouble. In 2001, the Vancouver Grizzlies, before moving to Memphis to become the Memphis Grizzlies, listed San Diego among the cities it was considering relocating to.

Longtime NBA commissioner David Stern, when asked about the potential return of the NBA to San Diego, routinely underscored the need for a new arena in the region for it to be considered for a franchise. On August 29, 2020, following a competitive proposal selection process, mayor Kevin Faulconer announced that city officials had selected a development team to build a new privately-funded sports arena and entertainment district at the site of the San Diego Sports Arena in the city's Midway District. In January 2021, new mayor Todd Gloria, on the topic of the new arena, stated "we would welcome the NBA's interest." He continued by saying "...this project is not dependent on recruiting new professional sports. This is a world-class entertainment (venue) for San Diegans". In late 2020, it was revealed that the arena plan selected by Faulconer's team violated a new California state law requiring the property's solicitation to affordable housing developers before other parties. In June 2021, Mayor Gloria announced the city had restarted the solicitation process for the new arena and entertainment district. In September 2022, the city announced it had selected the new development team and a proposal for a new 16,000-seat arena and an estimated 4,000 residential units on the 48 acre site.

Louisville
Louisville, Kentucky business leaders have attempted to attract an NBA team several times in the past, including the Buffalo Braves in 1978, the Cleveland Cavaliers in 1983, and the Houston Rockets, Charlotte Hornets, and Vancouver Grizzlies in the early 2000s. The Grizzlies in particular came very close to relocating to Louisville, with Louisville being the other finalist city before the team chose Memphis, Tennessee, where they are now known as the Memphis Grizzlies.

Louisville has two basketball arenas with capacities in line with current NBA arenas, each of which is currently home to an NCAA Division I basketball team. The downtown KFC Yum! Center, which opened in 2010, holds 22,090 and hosts the Louisville Cardinals of the Atlantic Coast Conference (ACC). The Cardinals' former home arena, Freedom Hall, located on the grounds of the Kentucky Exposition Center, opened in 1956 (though renovated several times), holds 18,252 and hosts the Bellarmine Knights of the ASUN Conference, who made the jump to Division I in 2020. Both arenas have hosted well-attended NBA exhibition games.

Louisville previously hosted major professional basketball with the Kentucky Colonels of the American Basketball Association (ABA) from 1967 to 1976, the entire duration of the league. The team folded when it was left out of the ABA–NBA merger. During their nine seasons playing at Freedom Hall, the Colonels won the most games and had the highest winning percentage of any franchise in the league. The team won the ABA Finals in 1975.

Vancouver

Vancouver is the third-largest Canadian city and has a metropolitan area population of 2.6 million as of 2021. Vancouver previously hosted the Vancouver Grizzlies, who began play as an NBA expansion team in 1995 along with the Toronto Raptors in the league's first expansion into Canada. The team played at General Motors Place (now known as Rogers Arena) and was sold and relocated to Memphis, Tennessee in 2001 after experiencing financial difficulty and poor play throughout most of its six seasons in Vancouver. The franchise is now known as the Memphis Grizzlies.

The city is currently host to the National Hockey League (NHL)'s Vancouver Canucks and Major League Soccer (MLS)'s Vancouver Whitecaps FC.

Montreal
Montreal in Canada is the second-largest Canadian city and is one of the largest markets in North America without an NBA franchise. It has a metropolitan population of 4 million, more than any other American or Canadian area without an NBA franchise. Montreal also has a modern arena suitable for basketball, the Bell Centre, which can hold up to 22,000 attendees for basketball. In addition, the city has regularly hosted the Toronto Raptors' preseason games. In 2018, a group of local businesspeople led by Michael Fortier announced their intention of seeking investors for an expansion team.

Montreal currently hosts the National Hockey League (NHL)'s Montreal Canadiens and Major League Soccer (MLS)'s CF Montréal.

Kansas City
Kansas City, Missouri previously hosted the Kansas City Kings from 1972 to 1985 (including three years where the team was shared with Omaha, Nebraska) until they moved to Sacramento, California, where they are now known as the Sacramento Kings.

Kansas City has a larger media market than current NBA cities Milwaukee, Oklahoma City, New Orleans, and Memphis. The city has the T-Mobile Center, an arena opened in 2007 that seats 18,972. It has hosted the Big 12 men's basketball tournament and both the men's and women's NCAA Division I men's basketball tournament games. The city is also home to the College Basketball Hall of Fame.

Kansas City is currently host of the National Football League (NFL)'s Kansas City Chiefs, Major League Baseball (MLB)'s Kansas City Royals, Major League Soccer (MLS)'s Sporting Kansas City, and National Women's Soccer League (NWSL)'s Kansas City Current.

Pittsburgh
Pittsburgh has a modern arena, PPG Paints Arena (which opened in 2010), that holds over 19,000 for basketball. It was rumored for a short time that the Detroit Pistons were moving to Pittsburgh, and Pittsburgh was one of the cities mentioned by David Stern as a possible relocation site in 2013. Pittsburgh has a long basketball tradition with NCAA Division I college programs Pitt, Duquesne, and Robert Morris in the area.

Pittsburgh previously hosted the Pittsburgh Pipers/Condors of the American Basketball Association (ABA) for the 1967–68 season and from 1969 to 1972 (the franchise spent the 1968–69 season in Minnesota). The Pipers won the ABA Finals in 1968. The city has also hosted the 1995 CBA finalist Pittsburgh Piranhas, the Pittsburgh Rens of the ABL and the Pittsburgh Ironmen of the BAA.

Pittsburgh currently hosts three major professional sports teams: the National Hockey League (NHL)'s Pittsburgh Penguins (who are the primary tenants of PPG Paints Arena), the National Football League (NFL)'s Pittsburgh Steelers, and Major League Baseball (MLB)'s Pittsburgh Pirates.

Hampton Roads
The Hampton Roads metropolitan area in Virginia has no major league sports team, but in August 2017, there was a proposal to bring an NBA team to the area's largest city, Virginia Beach whenever a sports arena is approved and built to host the team in the future.

The region previously hosted the Virginia Squires of the American Basketball Association (ABA) from 1970 to 1976.

Mexico City
Since 1992, the NBA Global Games have had NBA games hosted in different places around the world, with Palacio de los Deportes in Mexico City (the capital and most populous city in Mexico) being one of the venues for hosting preseason games and regular season games. The arena has a capacity of over 20,000.

On December 7, 2017, reports stated that the NBA would put an NBA G League team in the city. Commissioner Adam Silver also made a statement that the NBA had been in discussions to open an NBA Academy in that city for Latin American and Caribbean players. The team is scheduled to begin play in the 2021–22 NBA G League season.

Teams

The NBA originated in 1946 with 11 teams, and through a sequence of team expansions, reductions, and relocations currently consists of 30 teams. The United States is home to 29 teams and one is located in Canada.

In the following table it shows current NBA teams that are participating in the 2020–21 NBA season, in which city they are located, when the club was founded, joined the NBA, number of times relocated and times the franchise name has changed.

Current

Notes:

 The Charlotte Hornets are regarded as a continuation of the original Charlotte franchise. Because of this, the New Orleans Pelicans are no longer the same franchise as the original Charlotte Hornets. The New Orleans Pelicans were established in 2002. The Charlotte Hornets rejoined the league in 2004, and were known as the Bobcats from 2004 to 2014.
 Spent two seasons as Oklahoma City/New Orleans Hornets due to Hurricane Katrina.
 Spent one season in Tampa Bay due to the COVID-19 pandemic.

Former

See also
 List of defunct National Basketball Association teams
 List of relocated National Basketball Association teams
 Timeline of the National Basketball Association

References

National Basketball Association
Proposed sports teams